William "Chick" Starr (February 16, 1911 – August 12, 1991) was a Major League Baseball catcher.

He was born in Brooklyn, New York, and was Jewish. He attended James Medill High School in Chicago, Illinois.

References

External links

Major League Baseball catchers
Washington Senators (1901–1960) players
Lincoln Links players
Norfolk Elks players
St. Joseph Saints players
Rock Island Islanders players
Albany Senators players
Harrisburg Senators players
San Diego Padres (minor league) players
Baseball players from New York (state)
Sportspeople from Brooklyn
Baseball players from New York City
1911 births
1991 deaths
Jewish American baseball players
Jewish Major League Baseball players
20th-century American Jews